Salton is a surname. Notable people with the surname include:

Alexander Salton (1869–1916), Australian rules football umpire
Basei Marzia Salton (born 1997), Italian cyclist
Darren Salton (born 1972), Scottish footballer
Gerard Salton (1927–1995), American computer scientist